Haryana Gana Parishad (Haryana Popular Association), a political party in Haryana, India. HGP was formed when Hissar Lok Sabha MP Jai Prakash was expelled from Haryana Vikas Party. HGP merged with Indian National Congress on 8 April 1999.

Defunct political parties in Haryana
Political parties disestablished in 1999
1999 disestablishments in India
Political parties with year of establishment missing